2015–16 Deodhar Trophy was the 43rd season of the Deodhar Trophy, a List A competition. It was played in a three team format between Gujarat, the winners of 2015–16 Vijay Hazare Trophy, and two teams selected by the BCCI.

Squads
India A and India B squads were announced on 5 January 2016.

Group stage 
Points table

Matches

Final

References

External links 
 Series home on ESPN

Deodhar Trophy
Deodhar Trophy
Professional 50-over cricket competitions
Deodhar Trophy